Tony Washington Jr. (born June 1, 1992) is an American football outside linebacker who is currently a free agent. He was signed by the Houston Texans as an undrafted free agent in 2015. He played college football at the University of Oregon for the Ducks.

Professional career

Houston Texans
After going undrafted in the 2015 NFL Draft, Washington signed with the Houston Texans. He was placed on injured reserve on September 5, 2015, but was waived with an injury settlement on September 11, 2015. He was re-signed to the practice squad on December 9, 2015. He signed a reserve/future contract with the Texans on January 11, 2016.

On September 3, 2016, he was waived/injured by the Texans and placed on injured reserve.

On September 2, 2017, Washington was waived by the Texans.

Tennessee Titans
On September 20, 2017, Washington was signed to the Tennessee Titans' practice squad. He was released on October 5, 2017.

On August 12, 2018, Washington re-signed with the Titans. He was waived on September 1, 2018.

Coaching career
In 2019, Washington took an assistant football coaching position at the University of Nebraska.

References

External links
 Oregon profile

1992 births
Living people
People from Rancho Cucamonga, California
Players of American football from California
Sportspeople from San Bernardino County, California
American football linebackers
Oregon Ducks football players
Houston Texans players
Tennessee Titans players